Tylopeza is a genus of moths belonging to the family Tortricidae.

Species
Tylopeza zelotypa (Meyrick, 1912)

See also
List of Tortricidae genera

References

 , 1995, Acta zool. cracov. 38: 279.
 , 2005, World Catalogue of Insects 5

External links
tortricidae.com

Euliini
Tortricidae genera